Hans Peter (Hans) Matthiae (?-Ardmore, County Waterford, 4 January 2023) was a German Michelin star winning head chef and owner of the restaurant Chez Hans in Cashel, County Tipperary, Ireland.

In 1968 Matthiae bought the former Synod Hall on Moor Street in Cashel. After a major renovation he opened is as a restaurant. It became a quality restaurant that was awarded one Michelin star 1983. The Michelin Guide awarded the restaurant the "Red M", indicating 'good food at a reasonable price', in the period 1981–1982, 1985-1986 and 1996. The Egon Ronay Guide awarded the restaurant one star in 1982.

Hans Matthiae retired in 1998 and handed the kitchen over to his son Jason.

References 

Irish chefs
German chefs
Living people
Head chefs of Michelin starred restaurants
Year of birth missing (living people)